William Hodge McKinlay (23 August 1904 — 1976) was a Scottish professional footballer who made 356 competitive appearances for Nottingham Forest. He also played for Bathgate, Alloa Athletic and Albion Rovers in the Scottish Football League.

His nephew Bob McKinlay also played for Nottingham Forest, and holds the club's all-time appearance record.

Career statistics

References 

1904 births
1976 deaths
Date of death missing
Scottish footballers
People from Dysart, Fife
Footballers from Fife
Association football wing halves
Nottingham Forest F.C. players
English Football League players
Scottish Football League players
Bathgate F.C. players
Alloa Athletic F.C. players
Albion Rovers F.C. players